Minuscule 829 (in the Gregory-Aland numbering), ε220 (von Soden), is a 12th-century Greek minuscule manuscript of the New Testament on parchment.

Description 
The codex contains the text of the four Gospels, on 222 parchment leaves (size ). It lacks text of Matthew 1:1-13:28. The text is written in two columns per page, 26 lines per page. It is ornamented.

The numbers of the Ammonian Sections are given with a references to the Eusebian Canons (written under Ammonian Sections) at the margin.

It has so called Jerusalem Colophon at the end Gospel of Mark.

Text 
The Greek text of the codex is a representative of the Byzantine text-type. Hermann von Soden classified it to the textual family Iβ. Kurt Aland did not place it in any Category.
According to Gregory it could be related to the textual family f13.

According to the Claremont Profile Method it represents textual cluster 1216 in Luke 1, Luke 10, and Luke 20, which stands in considerable distance to Kx.

The texts of the Matthew 16:2b–3, John 5:4.5, and the Pericope Adulterae (John 7:53-8:11) are marked by an obelus. The text of the Christ's agony at Gethsemane (Luke 22:43.44) is marked by "Lk".

History 

Gregory dated the manuscript to the 12th century, other palaeographers dated it to the 11th century. Currently the manuscript is dated by the INTF to the 12th century.

The manuscript was examined and described by Antonio Rocci in 1882. It was added to the list of New Testament manuscripts by Scrivener (627) and Gregory (829e). Gregory saw it in 1886.

Currently the manuscript is housed at the Biblioteca della Badia (A' α. 6), in Grottaferrata.

See also 

 List of New Testament minuscules
 Biblical manuscript
 Textual criticism
 Minuscule 830

References

Further reading 

 
 Antonio Rocci, Codices cryptenses, seu Abbatiae Cryptae Ferratae in Tusculano digesti et illustrati (Tusculanum 1883), pp. 6–7.

Greek New Testament minuscules
12th-century biblical manuscripts